Frank Close (23 April 1913 – 12 February 1970) was a British long-distance runner. He competed in the men's 5000 metres at the 1936 Summer Olympics.

References

1913 births
1970 deaths
Athletes (track and field) at the 1936 Summer Olympics
British male long-distance runners
Olympic athletes of Great Britain
Place of birth missing